Hakan Nawabi, is an Afghan-Canadian freelance journalist, writer, entrepreneur and blogger. Previously served as Press Officer, Protocol Officer and Executive Assistant for the Embassy of Afghanistan in New Delhi, India from August 2011 to December 2014. He is well known for his number of quotations on peace, stability, unity, love and friendship. Nawabi is the son of Afghan well-known poet, writer, school principal and cultural personality; Massoud Nawabi who have been listed as the most prominent cultural personality at the history of Afghanistan in 2011 and is the grand son of Ghulam Habib Nawabi, who was the last of the great Dari Poet and among the first to introduce modern Dari poetry in Afghanistan.

Early life and background 
Hakan was born on July 31 in Kabul, Afghanistan, the elder of two children. His father Massoud Nawabi, was a poet, writer, school principal, cultural personality and a well known public figure. He spent early years of his childhood and middle class of school in Kabul. In 1996 Hakan and his family moved to Pakistan where his father established a school; Ghulam Habib Nawabi and the Educational Committee for Afghan Refugees (ECAR) in Islamabad. On January 2, 2010, when Hakan was 20 years old, his father passed away in result of a sudden heart failure in Islamabad, Pakistan. Shortly after, in 2011 after a year of working as an interpreter, anchor and news analyst to a private telecommunication company called IBEX Groups, in Islamabad, he moved to India with his mother and younger brother, Jamshed.

Influences 
Acknowledged for the quality of his writing, his portfolios are diverse and rich as compared to any other youngster of his age; he has been writing in leading in both Dari and in English dailies, magazines, blogs, websites as a ‘freelance feature writer’ apart from working on different designations in different cities of South Asian countries like; Kabul, Islamabad and New Delhi and now in Canada. Moreover, he has been involved in many a self-styled endeavor which have fulfilled his intellectual appetite to an extent that he has always managed to keep his countenance happy and upbeat, and has stood tall against all odds.

Previously engaged in a diplomatic mission at the Embassy of the Islamic Republic of Afghanistan in New Delhi - India, Hakan has what it takes to fulfill the requirements which the love of work and the pen brings in. His only wish is to make the nation proud with his literary initiatives.

Selected quote

References

External links
hakanmassoudnavabi.blogspot.in

1994 births
Afghan journalists
Afghan writers
Living people